was a Japanese animator, illustrator and character designer. He died of amyloidosis on March 5, 2023.

Works
City Hunter 3 (Key animation)
Idol Tenshi Yokoso Yōko (Key animation)
Dirty Pair Flash (Character design, animation director)
Mobile Fighter G Gundam (Chief animation director)
The King of Braves GaoGaiGar (Character designs and chief animation director)
Betterman (Character designs and chief animation director)
Variable Geo (Character designs)
Steam-Heart's (Character designs)
Usagi-chan de Cue!! (Character designs)
Brigadoon: Marin & Melan (Character designs and chief animation director)
Kiddy Grade (Eyecatch illustrator – episode 4)
Shinkon Gattai Godannar!! (Character designs and chief animation director)
Mobile Suit Gundam SEED (Eyecatch illustrator)
Superior Defender Gundam Force (Character designs)
Mobile Suit Gundam SEED DESTINY (Eyecatch illustrator)
Gun Sword (Character designs and chief animation director)
Blood+ (Key animation)
Code Geass (Character designs and chief animation director)
Dororon Enma-kun Meeramera (Character designs and chief animation director)
Xenoblade Chronicles 2 (Guest character design)

References

External links
  ぱにっくMEDIA MIX -Webショップ- official Web site
 

1964 births
2023 deaths
Anime character designers
Deaths from amyloidosis
Japanese animators
Japanese animated film directors
Osaka University alumni
People from Fukuoka Prefecture
Sunrise (company) people
Variable Geo